The Sibaysky mine is a large copper mine located in the south Russia in Baymaksky District, Bashkortostan
. Sibaysky represents one of the largest copper reserve in Russia and in the world having estimated reserves of 1.48 billion tonnes of ore grading 0.91% copper.

References 

Copper mines in Russia